Tukey Island is an island near the center of the Joubin Islands. Named by Advisory Committee on Antarctic Names (US-ACAN) for Claude C. Tukey, Messman in R.V. Hero on her first voyage to Antarctica and nearby Palmer Station in 1968.

See also 
 List of Antarctic and sub-Antarctic islands

References 

Islands of the Palmer Archipelago